Scunthorpe General Hospital is the main hospital for North Lincolnshire. It is situated on Church Lane in the west of Scunthorpe, off Kingsway (the A18), and north of the railway. 

Until the 1970s, it was known as Scunthorpe and District War Memorial Hospital.

A & E is at the far north of the site on Cliff Gardens, accessed via Highfield Avenue, off Doncaster Road (the A1029). As well as North Lincolnshire, it also serves Gainsborough and Goole. It is managed by Northern Lincolnshire and Goole Hospitals NHS Foundation Trust.

History

Background
In the 1850s when the steel industry was forming, if there were serious accidents at work, men were taken by horse and cart to the ferry at New Holland and then on to Hull. In the late 1800s makeshift facilities were set up in Frodingham Town Hall.

After the First World War, the need for a hospital became increasingly urgent when the town increased in size after the Appleby-Frodingham Steel Company was formed. Lord St Oswald, who had owned land on which the steelworks were built, donated land off Doncaster Road for a hospital to be built.

Formation
In the late 1920s, at long last, work gathered pace to build a hospital. Subscriptions from local workmen were collected and local fundraising took place. Each year there was the Annual Hospital Carnival. The Scunthorpe and District War Memorial Hospital opened on 5 December 1929. It cost £65,000 and had 72 beds. For the first year, the running of the hospital cost around £13,000. By 1931 the beds increased to 86 and X-ray equipment was installed. On 26 October 1933 the nurses home was opened by Prince George, Duke of Kent, costing £15,000, with training facilities recognised by the General Nursing Council for England and Wales.

Expansion
In 1935 it increased to 130 beds, with wards named after Appleby Frodingham, Lysaght's, Redbourn, Firth Brown and Winn – the local steel companies, who were funding half the hospital's costs. In-patients cost 7s 5d per day. Further expansion, including the outpatients, was planned in mid-1939, and completed in 1942, being opened on 15 July 1942 by Ernest Brown, the Minister of Health, and cost £110,000.

Post-war
On 5 July 1948 Scunthorpe War Memorial Hospital became part of the NHS, administered by Scunthorpe Hospital Management Committee (SHMC), which also controlled Scunthorpe Maternity Home, Brumby Hospital and Glanford Hospital Brigg. Prior to the NHS, most of the funding came from the Appleby-Frodingham Steel Company.

The Coronation Wing Block, with 165 beds, was opened on 15 July 1966. The name was changed to Scunthorpe General Hospital in 1971. In June 1974 the hospital had its worst incident (Britain's biggest peacetime explosion) to deal with when the Nypro caprolactam plant at Flixborough exploded. A year later there was a serious accident at the steelworks in November 1975, killing several people. Then, in May 1982, a stand holding 800 people at Normanby Hall, for It's a Knockout, collapsed seriously injuring 60 people.

A new £2.5 million three-storey A & E unit was built in the late 1980s. On 19 May 1993 a new wing was opened by the Queen, in a tour of south Humberside, known as the Queen's Building.

Hospital radio

The origin of the current Hospital Radio service was in 1951 when John Tock recorded a commentary on a tape recorder of a football match at the Old Showground between Scunthorpe United and Accrington Stanley. Once the final whistle had sounded, he cycled up to the then War Memorial Hospital and played the tape back on the wards. It was such a success that he continued to do it until eventually live broadcasts began from a dedicated commentary box – direct to the hospital. A music request show followed, initially from a studio at the top of a lift shaft. In 1979 the existing studio building was opened, with an extension including a new studio being added in 2000. This was officially opened by the Duke of Edinburgh on 31 July 2002 during a visit to Scunthorpe for the Golden Jubilee Celebrations.

See also
 List of hospitals in England

References

External links
 NLG
 Map of the site
 Scunthorpe Hospital Radio

Hospital buildings completed in 1929
Hospitals in Lincolnshire
Hospitals established in 1929
Buildings and structures in Scunthorpe
NHS hospitals in England